Hnyla Lypa is a river in Ukraine, a tributary of the Dniester river.

The name literally means "rotten linden tree" both in Polish and Ukrainian.  It  runs parallel to the Zolota Lypa river.

The river is namesake to the Battle of Gnila Lipa on 29–30 August 1914, where the Imperial Russian Army defeated the Austro-Hungarian Army.

Settlements
Peremyshliany 
Rohatyn
Burshtyn

References

External links
 Hnyla Lypa at the Ukrainian Soviet Encyclopedia
 Kahalo, O. Hnyla Lypa. Encyclopedia of Modern Ukraine.

Rivers of Ivano-Frankivsk Oblast
Rivers of Lviv Oblast